Kotdwar  is a proposed district in the state of Uttarakhand, India. If created, its district headquarters will be at the town of Kotdwar It is currently part of Pauri Garhwal district. Area of the proposed Kotdwar district is 1426 sq km and population is 365,850.

Tehsils

Lansdowne
Satpuli
Kotdwar
Dhumakote
Yamkeshwar.

References

Proposed districts of Uttarakhand